Upper Oxford Township is a township in Chester County, Pennsylvania, United States.  As of the 2010 census, the township had a population of 2,484.

Geography

Transportation

U.S. Route 1 is the most prominent highway serving Upper Oxford Township. It follows the Kennett Oxford Bypass along a southwest-northeast alignment through the southeastern part of the township. Pennsylvania Route 10 follows Limestone Road along a southwest-northeast alignment through the central portion of the township. Finally, Pennsylvania Route 896 follows Newark Road along a northwest-southeast alignment through the middle of the township.

Demographics

At the 2010 census, the township was 86.1% non-Hispanic White, 3.7% Black or African American, 0.4% Native American, 0.3% Asian, and 2.1% were two or more races. 7.8% of the population were of Hispanic or Latino ancestry.

At the 2000 census there were 2,095 people, 725 households, and 584 families living in the township.  The population density was 124.8 people per square mile (48.2/km).  There were 743 housing units at an average density of 44.3/sq mi (17.1/km).  The racial makeup of the township was 91.69% White, 3.68% African American, 0.38% Native American, 0.33% Asian, 2.43% from other races, and 1.48% from two or more races. Hispanic or Latino of any race were 2.67%.

There were 725 households, 40.6% had children under the age of 18 living with them, 72.4% were married couples living together, 5.1% had a female householder with no husband present, and 19.4% were non-families. 14.5% of households were made up of individuals, and 5.5% were one person aged 65 or older.  The average household size was 2.88 and the average family size was 3.24.

The age distribution was 29.1% under the age of 18, 5.9% from 18 to 24, 31.8% from 25 to 44, 24.6% from 45 to 64, and 8.6% 65 or older.  The median age was 36 years. For every 100 females, there were 104.0 males.  For every 100 females age 18 and over, there were 103.6 males.

The median household income was $61,094 and the median family income  was $66,875. Males had a median income of $43,594 versus $30,990 for females. The per capita income for the township was $24,641.  About 3.9% of families and 4.9% of the population were below the poverty line, including 5.5% of those under age 18 and 6.9% of those age 65 or over.

References

External links

 Upper Oxford Township

Townships in Chester County, Pennsylvania
Townships in Pennsylvania